Yukon territorial electoral districts are currently single member ridings that each elect one member to the Yukon Legislative Assembly.

Current 
These districts will be used for the 2021 Yukon general election.

References

See also 

 Canadian provincial electoral districts

Electoral districts
Yukon_territorial_electoral_districts